The Ford Hot Shots was the annual skills competition preceding both the Scotties Tournament of Hearts and the Tim Hortons Brier, Canada's women's and men's national curling championships respectively. The competition has not been held since 2018.

History
When Ford became a sponsor of the World Curling Championships in 1995, it also began a tradition of a skills competition preceding Canada's national championships.

The change in competition format for the 2018 Tournament of Hearts and 2018 Brier led to a change in format for the Hot Shots. Fifteen teams would compete instead of individual curlers, with the winning team being awarded a cheque for $15,000 and one of four Hot Shots spectators winning the two-year lease on the Ford vehicle. The three finalist spectators would each receive $500 to donate to the charities of their choice.

Disciplines
There were six disciplines that each competitor (for 2018, each team) had to do:

The "hit and stay" (they must hit a rock on the button and not roll out)
The "draw to the button" (they must throw the rock as close as possible to the centre of the rings)
The "draw through the port" (the must throw the rock as close as possible to the centre of the rings, but go between two guard rocks in the process.
The "raise" (they must bump a guard rock into the rings as close as possible to the centre)
The "hit and roll" (they must hit a rock at the edge of the rings and roll as close as possible to the centre of the rings)
The "double" (they must remove two rocks with one stone, and end up as close as possible to the centre of the rings)

Since 2017, the event included five new disciplines:
The "Hackner double", replicating Al Hackner's famous double takeout at the 1985 Labatt Brier.
The "Schmirler shot", replicating Sandra Schmirler's in-off at the 1997 Canadian Olympic Curling Trials to send her team to the 1998 Winter Olympics. 
A "straight raise to the button"
A "drag-effect double takeout"
An "around the horn triple takeout for two".

Scoring
For each shot, where the shooter rock came to rest determined how many points were earned. A rock that ended up on the button received 5 points. A rock that ended up in the 4 foot ring got 4 points. 8 foot ring, 3; 12 foot for 2; and one point if a "shot has been to have provided some sort of positive result."

Prizes
Until 2018, the winner of the Hot Shots received a 2-year lease on a Ford vehicle. First and Second runners-up received cash ($2000 and $1000 respectively). In 2009, the women's winner received a lease on a 2009 Ford Flex SEL FWD and the men's winner received a lease on a 2009 Ford F-150 XLT 4x4. In 2013 the lease vehicle was a Ford Fusion SE.

Winning women's vehicles:
1995: Ford Contour GL
1996: Mercury Mystique
1997: Ford Contour
1998: Mercury Mystique LS
1999: Mercury Mystique LS
2000: Ford Taurus SE
2001: Ford Taurus SE
2002: Ford Focus SE Wagon
2003: Ford Focus ZX5
2004: Ford Escape XLT FWD
2005: Ford Freestyle SEL
2006: Ford Explorer XLT
2007: Ford Edge
2008: Ford Fusion SEL V6
2009: Ford Flex SEL FWD
2010: Ford Taurus SEL FWD
2011: Ford Edge FW
2012: Ford Focus Titanium
2013: Ford Fusion SE 2.0L
2014: Ford Fusion SE 2.0L AWD
2015: Ford F-150 XLT
2016: Ford Edge Sport EcoBoost
2017: Ford Escape SE
2018: Ford Escape SE

Winners

References

 
ExtraEnd Magazine, 2009-10 edition, pg 20-21

The Brier
Scotties Tournament of Hearts
Curling trophies and awards
Ford Motor Company